William Hart-Smith (23 November 1911 – 15 April 1990) was a New Zealand/Australian poet who was born in Tunbridge Wells, Kent, England. His family moved to New Zealand in 1924. He had about "seven years of formal schooling" in England, Scotland and New Zealand before getting work at 15. His first job was as a radio mechanic. In 1936 he emigrated to Australia, working in commercial radio, and then the Australian Broadcasting Commission. He then did army service, returned to ABC, and resigned spending a year in the Northern Territory, becoming a freelance writer.

Hart-Smith was connected with the Jindyworobak Movement and had some of his work, such as Columbus Goes West (1943), published by them. However he spent only a decade in Australia, returning to New Zealand in 1946. From 1948 to 1954 he taught in adult education.

He spent several years in Perth from the late 1960s, associating with younger poets including Andrew Lansdown, Hal Colebatch and Lee Knowles. He was a prolific writer of poetry into old age, though many of his later poems have never been collected. He was also a distinguished conchologist, specialising in classifying cowrie shells. He said he had come to Perth from Sydney to find unpolluted water for shelling.

He was awarded the ALS Gold Medal in 1960, and won the Patrick White Award in 1987. He died in 1990.

Bibliography
 Poems (1942, self-published)
 Columbus Goes West (1943, Jindyworobak)
 Harvest (1945, Georgian House)
 The Unceasing Ground (1946, Angus and Robertson)
 Christopher Columbus : A Sequence of Poems (1948, The Caxton Press)
 On the Level (1950, self-published)
 Poems in Doggerel (1955, Handcraft Press)
 Poems of Discovery (1959, Angus and Robertson)
 The Talking Clothes : Poems (1966, Angus and Robertson)
 Mini-Poems (1974, Lesmurdie)
 Let me Learn the Steps : Poems from a Psychiatric Ward (1977, self-published) with Mary Morris
 Selected Poems 1936-1984 (1985, Angus and Robertson)
 Hand to Hand : A Garnering (1991, Butterfly Books)
 Birds, Beasts, Flowers : Australian Children's Poetry (1996, Penguin)

References
Allen Curnow - The Penguin Book of New Zealand Verse
 Harry P. Heseltine - The Penguin Book of Australian Verse

External links
 William Hart-Smith at AusLit

People from Royal Tunbridge Wells
1911 births
1990 deaths
New Zealand poets
New Zealand male writers
Australian male poets
New Zealand emigrants to Australia
British emigrants to New Zealand
Patrick White Award winners
20th-century Australian poets
ALS Gold Medal winners
20th-century Australian male writers